Brejo Grande is the easternmost municipality in the Brazilian state of Sergipe. Its population was 8,353 (2020) and its area is 143.9 km².

References

Populated places established in 1926
Populated coastal places in Sergipe
Municipalities in Sergipe